The 1951 Richmond Spiders football team was an American football team that represented the University of Richmond as a member of the Southern Conference (SoCon) during the 1951 college football season. Led by first-year head coach Ed Merrick, the Spiders compiled an overall record of 3–8 with a mark of 2–6 in conference play, tying for 12th place in the SoCon. The team's captain was Johnny Mac Brown.

Schedule

References

Richmond
Richmond Spiders football seasons
Richmond Spiders football